Martin Mockler (born 11 November 1893) was an Irish hurler who played as a full-back for the Tipperary senior team.

Mockler made his first appearance for the team during the 1919 championship and was a regular member of the starting fifteen until his retirement after the 1926 championship. During that time he won one All-Ireland medal and two Munster medals.

At club level Mockler was a one-time county championship medalist with Moycarkey–Borris.

References

1893 births
Year of death missing
Moycarkey-Borris hurlers
Tipperary inter-county hurlers
All-Ireland Senior Hurling Championship winners